Thalleulia ochreorufa is a species of moth of the family Tortricidae. It is found in Loja Province, Ecuador.

The wingspan is 21 mm. The ground colour of the forewings is cream ferruginous in the basal half and in the apical third mixed with chestnut brown, but browner at the wing base. The hindwings are cream, slightly mixed with pale orange in the apical area.

Etymology
The species name refers to colouration of the forewings and is derived from Latin ochreus (meaning rufus or rusty).

References

Moths described in 2008
Euliini
Moths of South America
Taxa named by Józef Razowski